The Holocaust Educational Foundation (HEF) is a nonprofit organization founded by Theodore Zev Weiss in 1976 and dedicated to the support of teaching and research about the Holocaust at the university level. A part of Northwestern University since 2013, HEF has helped create curriculum materials about the Holocaust in use at more than 400 colleges.

History
A survivor of the Auschwitz concentration camp, Weiss founded HEF in 1976 to record the testimonies of Holocaust survivors. In 1988, HEF provided funding to establish a course at Northwestern University called The History of the Holocaust, and thereafter HEF's mission evolved into the development of Holocaust-related teaching materials.
Weiss perceived that, while many states, like Illinois, mandate instruction in the Holocaust, "the state doesn't prepare teachers to teach. This is a very difficult subject, and not having the tools, the teachers are sort of at a loss."  On July 9, 2013, the HEF was integrated into Northwestern University. The HEF donated $1 million to Northwestern University and pledged to donate another $5 million to endow the program permanently.

Programming
The Holocaust Educational Foundation of Northwestern University offers several programs: the Summer Institute on the Holocaust and Jewish Civilization; the biennial Lessons and Legacies conference; the Sharon Abramson Research Grants; and teaching grants to support college-level teaching in Holocaust Studies.

See also
Holocaust Studies and Materials
Polish Center for Holocaust Research

References

External links
Foundation Website

Holocaust studies
Northwestern University
1976 establishments in Illinois